Difluoroethane may refer to:

 1,1-Difluoroethane
 1,2-Difluoroethane

See also
 Difluoroethene
 Dichloroethane